John Adams House may refer to:

in the United States
(by state)
Adams National Historic Site, Quincy, Massachusetts, birthplaces of two U.S. presidents
John Quincy Adams Birthplace, Quincy, Massachusetts, listed on the NRHP in Massachusetts
John Adams Birthplace, Quincy, Massachusetts, listed on the NRHP in Massachusetts
 Peacefield, or "Old House," the home of U.S. President John Adams and other Adamses, in Quincy, Massachusetts
John A. Adams Farmstead Historic District, Warrensburg, Missouri, listed on the NRHP in Johnson County, Missouri
John Adams Homestead-Wellscroft, Harrisville, New Hampshire, NRHP-listed
John H. Adams House, High Point, North Carolina, listed on the NRHP in Guilford County, North Carolina
John and Maria Adams House, Olmsted Falls, Ohio, NRHP-listed
John E. Adams House, Pawtucket, Rhode Island, NRHP-listed
John Alma Adams House, Pleasant Grove, Utah, NRHP-listed

See also
Adams House (disambiguation)